Camoes or Camões may refer to:

 Luís de Camões, Portuguese poet
 Camões Prize, a literary prize for the Portuguese language
 Camões (film), a 1946 Portuguese drama film
 Instituto Camões, a Portuguese institution for the promotion of Portuguese language and culture
 Camões Family, Portuguese surname
 Camões Secondary School, a school in Lisbon, Portugal
 Camoes (crater), a crater on Mercury
 5160 Camoes, an asteroid from the inner regions of the asteroid belt